Privokzalny (masculine), Privokzalnaya (feminine), or Privokzalnoye (neuter) is the name of several inhabited localities in Russia.

Modern rural localities
Privokzalny, Oryol Oblast, a settlement in Nizhne-Zalegoshchensky Selsoviet of Zalegoshchensky District of Oryol Oblast
Privokzalny, Ryazan Oblast, a settlement in Krasnoozerkovsky Rural Okrug of Sarayevsky District of Ryazan Oblast
Privokzalny, Sverdlovsk Oblast, a settlement in Verkhotursky District of Sverdlovsk Oblast

Historical inhabited localities
Privokzalny, Moscow Oblast, a former urban-type settlement in Moscow Oblast; since 2003—a part of the town of Volokolamsk

References